Dwight Anderson may refer to:

 Dwight Anderson (basketball) (1960–2020), American basketball player
 Dwight Anderson (gridiron football) (born 1981), Canadian football defensive back
 Dwight W. Anderson, American hedge fund manager